Ceres (minor-planet designation: 1 Ceres) is a dwarf planet in the asteroid belt between the orbits of Mars and Jupiter. It was the first asteroid discovered, on 1 January 1801, by Giuseppe Piazzi at Palermo Astronomical Observatory in Sicily and announced as a new planet. Ceres was later classified as an asteroid and then a dwarf planetthe only one orbiting entirely within Neptune's orbit.

Ceres's small size means that even at its brightest, it is too dim to be seen by the naked eye, except under extremely dark skies. Its apparent magnitude ranges from 6.7 to 9.3, peaking at opposition (when it is closest to Earth) once every 15- to 16-month synodic period. As a result, its surface features are barely visible even with the most powerful telescopes, and little was known about it until the robotic NASA spacecraft Dawn approached Ceres for its orbital mission in 2015.

Dawn found Ceres's surface to be a mixture of water ice, and hydrated minerals such as carbonates and clay. Gravity data suggest Ceres to be partially differentiated into a muddy (ice-rock) mantle/core and a less dense but stronger crust that is at most 30% ice by volume. Although Ceres likely lacks an internal ocean of liquid water, brines still flow through the outer mantle and reach the surface, allowing cryovolcanoes such as Ahuna Mons to form roughly every fifty million years. This makes Ceres the closest known cryovolcanic body to the Sun, and the brines provide a potential habitat for microbial life.

In January 2014, emissions of water vapour were detected around Ceres, creating a tenuous, transient atmosphere known as an exosphere. This was unexpected because vapour is usually a hallmark of comets, not asteroids.

History

Discovery 
In the years between the acceptance of heliocentrism in the 18th century and the discovery of Neptune in 1846, several astronomers argued that mathematical laws predicted the existence of a hidden or missing planet between the orbits of Mars and Jupiter. In 1596 theoretical astronomer Johannes Kepler believed that the ratios between planetary orbits would conform to "God's design" only with the addition of two planets: one between Jupiter and Mars and one between Venus and Mercury. Other theoreticians, such as Immanuel Kant, pondered whether the gap had been created by the gravity of Jupiter; in 1761 astronomer and mathematician Johann Heinrich Lambert asked, "And who knows whether already planets are missing which have departed from the vast space between Mars and Jupiter? Does it then hold of celestial bodies as well as of the Earth, that the stronger chafe the weaker, and are Jupiter and Saturn destined to plunder forever?"

In 1772 German astronomer Johann Elert Bode, citing Johann Daniel Titius, published a formula later known as the Titius–Bode law that appeared to predict the orbits of the known planets but for an unexplained gap between Mars and Jupiter. This formula predicted that there ought to be another planet with an orbital radius near 2.8 astronomical units (AU), or 420millionkm, from the Sun. The Titius–Bode law gained more credence with William Herschel's 1781 discovery of Uranus near the predicted distance for a planet beyond Saturn. In 1800 a group headed by Franz Xaver von Zach, editor of the German astronomical journal  ("Monthly Correspondence"), sent requests to 24 experienced astronomers, whom he dubbed the "celestial police", asking that they combine their efforts and begin a methodical search for the expected planet. Although they did not discover Ceres, they later found the asteroids Pallas, Juno, and Vesta.

One of the astronomers selected for the search was Giuseppe Piazzi, a Catholic priest at the Academy of Palermo, Sicily. Before receiving his invitation to join the group, Piazzi discovered Ceres on 1 January 1801. He was searching for "the 87th [star] of the Catalogue of the Zodiacal stars of Mr la Caille", but found that "it was preceded by another". Instead of a star, Piazzi had found a moving star-like object, which he first thought was a comet. Piazzi observed Ceres 24 times, the final time on 11 February 1801, when illness interrupted his work. He announced his discovery on 24 January 1801 in letters to two fellow astronomers, his compatriot Barnaba Oriani of Milan and Bode in Berlin. He reported it as a comet, but "since its movement is so slow and rather uniform, it has occurred to me several times that it might be something better than a comet". In April, Piazzi sent his complete observations to Oriani, Bode, and French astronomer Jérôme Lalande.

By this time, the apparent position of Ceres had changed (primarily due to Earth's motion around the Sun), and was too close to the Sun's glare for other astronomers to confirm Piazzi's observations. Towards the end of the year, Ceres should have been visible again, but after such a long time, it was difficult to predict its exact position. To recover Ceres, mathematician Carl Friedrich Gauss, then 24 years old, developed an efficient method of orbit determination. Within a few weeks, he predicted the path of Ceres and sent his results to von Zach. On 31 December 1801, von Zach and fellow celestial policeman Heinrich W. M. Olbers found Ceres near the predicted position and continued to record its position. At 2.8 AU from the Sun, Ceres appeared to fit the Titius–Bode law almost perfectly; when Neptune was discovered in 1846, eight AU closer than predicted, most astronomers concluded that the law was a coincidence.

The early observers were able to calculate the size of Ceres only to within an order of magnitude. In the 1970s, infrared photometry enabled more accurate measurements of its albedo, and Ceres's diameter was determined to within 10% of its true value of 939km. Ceres has a surface area compareable to the area of Greenland.

Name and symbol 
Piazzi's proposed name for his discovery was Ceres Ferdinandea: Ceres after the Roman goddess of agriculture, whose earthly home, and oldest temple, lay in Sicily; and Ferdinandea in honour of Piazzi's monarch and patron, King FerdinandIII of Sicily. The latter was not acceptable to other nations and was dropped. Before von Zach's recovery of Ceres in December 1801, von Zach referred to the planet as Hera, and Bode referred to it as Juno. Despite Piazzi's objections, those names gained currency in Germany before the object's existence was confirmed. Once it was, astronomers settled on Piazzi's name.

The adjectival forms of Ceres are Cererian and Cererean, both pronounced . Cerium, a rare-earth element discovered in 1803, was named after the dwarf planet  Ceres.

The old astronomical symbol of Ceres, still used in astrology, is a sickle, . The sickle was one of the classical symbols of the goddess Ceres and was suggested, apparently independently, by von Zach and Bode in 1802. In form, it is similar to the symbol  (a circle with a small cross beneath) of the planet Venus, but with a break in the circle. It had various minor graphic variants, including a reversed form  typeset as a 'C' (the initial letter of the name Ceres) with a plus sign. The generic asteroid symbol of a numbered disk, ①, was introduced in 1867 and quickly became the norm.

Classification 

The categorisation of Ceres has changed more than once and has been the subject of some disagreement. Bode believed Ceres to be the "missing planet" he had proposed to exist between Mars and Jupiter. Ceres was assigned a planetary symbol and remained listed as a planet in astronomy books and tables (along with Pallas, Juno, and Vesta) for over half a century.

As other objects were discovered in the neighbourhood of Ceres, astronomers began to suspect that it represented the first of a new class of objects. When Pallas was discovered in 1802, Herschel coined the term asteroid ("star-like") for these bodies, writing that "they resemble small stars so much as hardly to be distinguished from them, even by very good telescopes". In 1852 Johann Franz Encke, in the Berliner Astronomisches Jahrbuch, declared the traditional system of granting planetary symbols too cumbersome for these new objects and introduced a new method of placing numbers before their names in order of discovery. Initially, the numbering system began with the fifth asteroid, 5 Astraea, as number1, but in 1867 Ceres was adopted into the new system under the name 1Ceres.

By the 1860s, astronomers widely accepted that a fundamental difference existed between the major planets and asteroids such as Ceres, though the word "planet" had yet to be precisely defined. In the 1950s, scientists generally stopped considering most asteroids as planets, but Ceres sometimes retained its status after that because of its planet-like geophysical complexity. Then, in 2006, the debate surrounding Pluto led to calls for a definition of "planet", and the possible reclassification of Ceres, perhaps even its general reinstatement as a planet. A proposal before the International Astronomical Union (IAU), the global body responsible for astronomical nomenclature and classification, defined a planet as "a celestial body that (a) has sufficient mass for its self-gravity to overcome rigid-body forces so that it assumes a hydrostatic equilibrium (nearly round) shape, and (b) is in orbit around a star, and is neither a star nor a satellite of a planet". Had this resolution been adopted, it would have made Ceres the fifth planet in order from the Sun, but on 24 August 2006 the assembly adopted the additional requirement that a planet must have "cleared the neighbourhood around its orbit". Ceres is not a planet because it does not dominate its orbit, sharing it as it does with the thousands of other asteroids in the asteroid belt and constituting only about 40% of the belt's total mass. Bodies that met the first proposed definition but not the second, such as Ceres, were instead classified as dwarf planets. Planetary geologists still often ignore this definition and consider Ceres to be a planet anyway.

Ceres is a dwarf planet, but there is some confusion about whether it is also an asteroid. A NASA webpage states that Vesta, the belt's second-largest object, is the largest asteroid. The IAU has been equivocal on the subject, though its Minor Planet Center, the organisation charged with cataloguing such objects, notes that dwarf planets may have dual designations,
and the joint IAU/USGS/NASA Gazetteer categorizes Ceres as both asteroid and a dwarf planet.

Orbit 

Ceres follows an orbit between Mars and Jupiter, near the middle of the asteroid belt, with an orbital period (year) of 4.6 Earth years. Compared to other planets and dwarf planets, Ceres's orbit is moderately tilted relative to that of Earth; its inclination (i) is 10.6°, compared to 7° for Mercury and 17° for Pluto. It is also slightly elongated, with an eccentricity (e) = 0.08, compared to 0.09 for Mars.

Ceres is not part of an asteroid family, probably due to its large proportion of ice, as smaller bodies with the same composition would have sublimated to nothing over the age of the Solar System. It was once thought to be a member of the Gefion family, the members of which share similar proper orbital elements, suggesting a common origin through an asteroid collision in the past. Ceres was later found to have a different composition from the Gefion family and appears to be an interloper, having similar orbital elements but not a common origin.

Resonances 
Due to their small masses and large separations, objects within the asteroid belt rarely fall into gravitational resonances with each other. Nevertheless, Ceres is able to capture other asteroids into temporary 1:1 resonances (making them temporary trojans), for periods from a few hundred thousand to more than two million years. Fifty such objects have been identified. Ceres is close to a 1:1 mean-motion orbital resonance with Pallas (their proper orbital periods differ by 0.2%), but not close enough to be significant over astronomical timescales.

Rotation and axial tilt 

The rotation period of Ceres (the Cererian day) is 9hours and 4minutes; the small equatorial crater of Kait is selected as its prime meridian. Ceres has an axial tilt of 4°, small enough for its polar regions to contain permanently shadowed craters that are expected to act as cold traps and accumulate water ice over time, similar to what occurs on the Moon and Mercury. About 0.14% of water molecules released from the surface are expected to end up in the traps, hopping an average of three times before escaping or being trapped.

Dawn, the first spacecraft to orbit Ceres, determined that the north polar axis points at right ascension 19h 25m 40.3s (291.418°), declination +66° 45' 50" (about 1.5 degrees from Delta Draconis), which means an axial tilt of 4°. This means that Ceres currently sees little to no seasonal variation in sunlight by latitude. Over the course of three million years, gravitational influence from Jupiter and Saturn has triggered cyclical shifts in Ceres's axial tilt, ranging from two to twenty degrees, meaning that seasonal variation in sun exposure has occurred in the past, with the last period of seasonal activity estimated at 14,000 years ago. Those craters that remain in shadow during periods of maximum axial tilt are the most likely to retain water ice from eruptions or cometary impacts over the age of the Solar System.

Geology 
Ceres is the largest asteroid in the main asteroid belt. It has been classified as a Ctype or carbonaceous asteroid and, due to the presence of clay minerals, as a G-type asteroid. It has a similar, but not identical, composition to that of carbonaceous chondrite meteorites. It is an oblate spheroid, with an equatorial diameter 8% larger than its polar diameter.

Ceres comprises 40% of the estimated  mass of the asteroid belt, and it has  times the mass of the next asteroid, Vesta, but it is only 1.3% the mass of the Moon. It is close to being in hydrostatic equilibrium, but some deviations from an equilibrium shape have yet to be explained. Assuming it is in equilibrium, Ceres is the only dwarf planet that is always within the orbit of Neptune. Modelling has suggested Ceres's rocky material is partially differentiated, and that it may possess a small core,
but the data are also consistent with a mantle of hydrated silicates and no core. Because Dawn lacked a magnetometer, it is not known if Ceres has a magnetic field; it is believed not to. Ceres's internal differentiation may be related to its lack of a natural satellite, as satellites of main belt asteroids are mostly believed to form from collisional disruption, creating an undifferentiated, rubble pile structure.

Surface

Composition 
The surface composition of Ceres is homogeneous on a global scale, and is rich in carbonates and ammoniated phyllosilicates that have been altered by water, though water ice in the regolith varies from approximately 10% in polar latitudes to much drier, even ice-free, in the equatorial regions.

Studies using the Hubble Space Telescope show graphite, sulfur, and sulfur dioxide on Ceres's surface. The graphite is evidently the result of space weathering on Ceres's older surfaces; the latter two are volatile under Cererian conditions and would be expected to either escape quickly or settle in cold traps, and so are evidently associated with areas with relatively recent geological activity.

Organic compounds were detected in Ernutet Crater, and most of the planet's near surface is rich in carbon, at approximately 20% by mass. The carbon content is more than five times higher than in carbonaceous chondrite meteorites analysed on Earth. The surface carbon shows evidence of being mixed with products of rock-water interactions, such as clays. This chemistry suggests Ceres formed in a cold environment, perhaps outside the orbit of Jupiter, and that it accreted from ultra-carbon-rich materials in the presence of water, which could provide conditions favourable to organic chemistry.

Craters 
Dawn revealed that Ceres has a heavily cratered surface, though with fewer large craters than expected. The most likely reason for this is viscous relaxation of the crust slowly flattening out larger impacts.

Ceres's north polar region shows far more cratering than the equatorial region, with the eastern equatorial region in particular comparatively lightly cratered. The overall size frequency of craters of between twenty and a hundred kilometres (10–60mi) is consistent with their having originated in the Late Heavy Bombardment, with craters outside the ancient polar regions likely erased by early cryovolcanism. Three large shallow basins (planitiae) with degraded rims are likely to be eroded craters. Two of the three have higher than average ammonium concentrations.

These boulders likely formed through impacts, and are found within or near craters, though not all craters contain boulders. Large boulders are more numerous at higher latitudes. Boulders on Ceres are brittle and degrade rapidly due to thermal stress (at dawn and dusk, the surface temperature changes rapidly) and meteoritic impacts. Their maximum age is estimated to be 150million years, much shorter than the lifetime of boulders on Vesta.

Tectonic features 
Although Ceres lacks plate tectonics, with the vast majority of its surface features linked either to impacts or to cryovolcanic activity, several potentially tectonic features have been tentatively identified on its surface, particularly in its eastern hemisphere. The Samhain Catenae, kilometre-scale linear fractures on Ceres's surface, lack any apparent link to impacts and bear a stronger resemblance to pit crater chains, which are indicative of buried normal faults. Also, several craters on Ceres have shallow, fractured floors consistent with cryomagmatic intrusion.

Cryovolcanism 

Ceres has one prominent mountain, Ahuna Mons; this appears to be a cryovolcano and has few craters, suggesting a maximum age of 240million years. Its relatively high gravitational field suggests it is dense, and thus composed more of rock than ice, and that its placement is likely due to diapirism of a slurry of brine and silicate particles from the top of the mantle. It is roughly antipodal to Kerwan Basin. Seismic energy from the Kerwan-forming impact may have focused on the opposite side of Ceres, fracturing the outer layers of the crust and triggering the movement of high-viscosity cryomagma (muddy water ice softened by its content of salts) onto the surface. Kerwan too shows evidence of the effects of liquid water due to impact-melting of subsurface ice.

A 2018 computer simulation suggests that cryovolcanoes on Ceres, once formed, recede due to viscous relaxation over several hundred million years. The team identified 22 features as strong candidates for relaxed cryovolcanoes on Ceres's surface. Yamor Mons, an ancient, impact-cratered peak, resembles Ahuna Mons despite being much older, due to it lying in Ceres's northern polar region, where lower temperatures prevent viscous relaxation of the crust. Models suggest that, over the past billion years, one cryovolcano has formed on Ceres on average every fifty million years. The eruptions are not uniformly distributed over Ceres, but may be linked to ancient impact basins. The model suggests that, contrary to findings at Ahuna Mons, Cererian cryovolcanoes must be composed of far less dense material than average for Ceres's crust, or the observed viscous relaxation could not occur.

An unexpectedly large number of Cererian craters have central pits, perhaps due to cryovolcanic processes; others have central peaks. Hundreds of bright spots (faculae) have been observed by Dawn, the brightest in the middle of  Occator Crater. The bright spot in the centre of Occator is named Cerealia Facula, and the group of bright spots to its east, Vinalia Faculae. Occator possesses a pit 9–10 km wide, partially filled by a central dome. The dome post-dates the faculae and is likely due to freezing of a subterranean reservoir, comparable to pingos in Earth's Arctic region. A haze periodically appears above Cerealia, supporting the hypothesis that some sort of outgassing or sublimating ice formed the bright spots. In March 2016 Dawn found definitive evidence of water ice on the surface of Ceres at Oxo crater.

On 9 December 2015 NASA scientists reported that the bright spots on Ceres may be due to a type of salt from evaporated brine containing magnesium sulfate hexahydrate (MgSO4·6H2O); the spots were also found to be associated with ammonia-rich clays. Near-infrared spectra of these bright areas were reported in 2017 to be consistent with a large amount of sodium carbonate and smaller amounts of ammonium chloride or ammonium bicarbonate. These materials have been suggested to originate from the crystallisation of brines that reached the surface. In August 2020 NASA confirmed that Ceres was a water-rich body with a deep reservoir of brine that percolated to the surface in hundreds of locations causing "bright spots", including those in Occator Crater.

Internal structure 
The active geology of Ceres is driven by ice and brines. Water leached from rock is estimated to possess a salinity of around 5%. Altogether, Ceres is approximately 50% water by volume (compared to 0.1% for Earth) and 73% rock by mass.

Ceres's largest craters are several kilometres deep, inconsistent with an ice-rich shallow subsurface. The fact that the surface has preserved craters almost  in diameter indicates that the outermost layer of Ceres is roughly 1000 times stronger than water ice. This is consistent with a mixture of silicates, hydrated salts and methane clathrates, with no more than 30% water ice by volume.

Gravity measurements from Dawn have generated three competing models for Ceres's interior. It is not possible to tell if Ceres's deep interior contains liquid or a core of dense material rich in metal, but the low central density suggests it may retain about 10% porosity.
Only partial dehydration (expulsion of ice) from the core is expected, though the high density of the mantle relative to water ice reflects its enrichment in silicates and salts. That is, the core (if it exists), the mantle and crust all consist of rock and ice, though in different ratios.

Ceres's mineral composition can be determined (indirectly) only for its outer . Under that is a layer that may contain a small amount of brine. This extends to a depth of at least the  limit of detection. Under that is thought to be a mantle dominated by hydrated rocks such as clays.

In one two-layer model Ceres consists of a core of chondrules and a mantle of mixed ice and micron-sized solid particulates ("mud"). Sublimation of ice at the surface would leave a deposit of hydrated particulates perhaps twenty metres thick. The range of the extent of differentiation is consistent with the data, from a large,  core of 75% chondrules and 25% particulates and a mantle of 75% ice and 25% particulates, to a small,  core consisting nearly entirely of particulates and a mantle of 30% ice and 70% particulates. With a large core, the core–mantle boundary should be warm enough for pockets of brine. With a small core, the mantle should remain liquid below . In the latter case a 2% freezing of the liquid reservoir would compress the liquid enough to force some to the surface, producing cryovolcanism.

A second two-layer model suggests a partial differentiation of Ceres into a volatile-rich crust and a denser mantle of hydrated silicates. A range of densities for the crust and mantle can be calculated from the types of meteorite thought to have impacted Ceres.

Atmosphere 
In 2017 Dawn confirmed that Ceres has a transient atmosphere of water vapour. Two potential source regions, designated Piazzi (123°E, 21°N) and Region A (231°E, 23°N), were visualised in the near infrared as dark areas (Region A also has a bright centre) by the Keck Observatory. In 2015 David Jewitt included Ceres in his list of active asteroids. Surface water ice is unstable at distances less than 5 AU from the Sun, so it is expected to sublime if exposed directly to solar radiation. Water ice can migrate from the deep layers of Ceres to the surface, but escapes in a short time. Surface sublimation would be expected to be lower when Ceres is farther from the Sun in its orbit, and internally powered emissions should not be affected by its orbital position. The limited data previously available suggested cometary-style sublimation, but evidence from Dawn suggests geologic activity could be at least partially responsible.

Studies using Dawn's gamma ray and neutron detector (GRaND) reveal that Ceres accelerates electrons from the solar wind; the most accepted hypothesis is that these electrons are being accelerated by collisions between the solar wind and a tenuous water vapour exosphere. Bow shocks like these could also be explained by a transient magnetic field, but this is considered less likely, as the interior of Ceres is not thought to be sufficiently electrically conductive.

Origin and evolution 
Ceres is a surviving protoplanet that formed 4.56billion years ago; alongside Pallas and Vesta, one of only three remaining in the inner Solar System, with the rest either merging to form terrestrial planets, being shattered in collisions or being ejected by Jupiter. Despite Ceres's current location, its composition is not consistent with having formed within the asteroid belt. It seems rather that it formed between the orbits of Jupiter and Saturn, and was deflected into the asteroid belt as Jupiter migrated outward. The discovery of ammonium salts in Occator Crater supports an origin in the outer Solar System, as ammonia is far more abundant in that region.

The early geological evolution of Ceres was dependent on the heat sources available during and after its formation: impact energy from planetesimal accretion and decay of radionuclides (possibly including short-lived extinct radionuclides such as aluminium-26). These may have been sufficient to allow Ceres to differentiate into a rocky core and icy mantle, or even a liquid water ocean, soon after its formation. This ocean should have left an icy layer under the surface as it froze. The fact that Dawn found no evidence of such a layer suggests that Ceres's original crust was at least partially destroyed by later impacts thoroughly mixing the ice with the salts and silicate-rich material of the ancient seafloor and the material beneath.

Ceres possesses surprisingly few large craters, suggesting that viscous relaxation and cryovolcanism have erased older geological features. The presence of clays and carbonates requires chemical reactions at temperatures above 50°C, consistent with hydrothermal activity.

It has become considerably less geologically active over time, with a surface dominated by impact craters; nevertheless, evidence from Dawn reveals that internal processes have continued to sculpt Ceres's surface to a significant extent contrary to predictions that Ceres's small size would have ceased internal geological activity early in its history.

Habitability 
Although Ceres is not as actively discussed as a potential home for microbial extraterrestrial life as Mars, Europa, Enceladus, or Titan are, it has the most water of any body in the inner Solar System after Earth, and the likely brine pockets under its surface could provide habitats for life. It does not experience tidal heating, like Europa or Enceladus, but it is close enough to the Sun, and contains enough long-lived radioactive isotopes, to preserve liquid water in its subsurface for extended periods. The remote detection of organic compounds and the presence of water mixed with 20% carbon by mass in its near surface could provide conditions favourable to organic chemistry. Of the biochemical elements, Ceres is rich in carbon, hydrogen, oxygen and nitrogen, but phosphorus has yet to be detected, and sulfur, despite being suggested by Hubble UV observations, was not detected by Dawn.

Observation and exploration

Observation 
When in opposition near its perihelion, Ceres can reach an apparent magnitude of +6.7. This is too dim to be visible to the average naked eye, but under ideal viewing conditions, keen eyes may be able to see it. Vesta is the only other asteroid that can regularly reach a similarly bright magnitude, while Pallas and 7 Iris do so only when both in opposition and near perihelion. When in conjunction, Ceres has a magnitude of around +9.3, which corresponds to the faintest objects visible with 10×50 binoculars; thus it can be seen with such binoculars in a naturally dark and clear night sky around new moon.

On 13 November 1984 an occultation of the star BD+8°471 by Ceres was observed in Mexico, Florida and across the Caribbean, allowing better measurements of its size, shape and albedo. On 25 June 1995 Hubble obtained ultraviolet images of Ceres with  resolution. In 2002 the Keck Observatory obtained infrared images with  resolution using adaptive optics.

Before the Dawn mission only a few surface features had been unambiguously detected on Ceres. High-resolution ultraviolet Hubble images in 1995 showed a dark spot on its surface, which was nicknamed "Piazzi" in honour of the discoverer of Ceres. It was thought to be a crater. Visible-light images of a full rotation taken by Hubble in 2003 and 2004 showed eleven recognisable surface features, the natures of which were undetermined. One of them corresponded to the Piazzi feature. Near-infrared images over a whole rotation, taken with adaptive optics by the Keck Observatory in 2012, showed bright and dark features moving with Ceres's rotation. Two dark features were circular and were presumed to be craters; one was observed to have a bright central region, and the other was identified as the Piazzi feature. Dawn eventually revealed Piazzi to be a dark region in the middle of Vendimia Planitia, close to the crater Dantu, and the other dark feature to be within Hanami Planitia and close to Occator Crater.

Dawn mission 
In the early 1990s NASA initiated the Discovery Program, which was intended to be a series of low-cost scientific missions. In 1996 the program's study team proposed a high-priority mission to explore the asteroid belt using a spacecraft with an ion engine. Funding remained problematic for nearly a decade, but by 2004 the Dawn vehicle passed its critical design review.

Dawn, the first space mission to visit either Vesta or Ceres, was launched on 27 September 2007. On 3 May 2011 Dawn acquired its first targeting image  from Vesta.

The spacecraft instrumentation included a framing camera, a visual and infrared spectrometer, and a gamma-ray and neutron detector. These instruments examined Ceres's shape and elemental composition. On 13 January 2015, as Dawn approached Ceres, the spacecraft took its first images at near-Hubble resolution, revealing impact craters and a small high-albedo spot on the surface. Additional imaging sessions, at increasingly better resolution took place from February to April.

Dawn's mission profile called for it to study Ceres from a series of circular polar orbits at successively lower altitudes. In October 2015 NASA released a true-colour portrait of Ceres made by Dawn. In 2017 Dawn'''s mission was extended to perform a series of closer orbits around Ceres until the hydrazine used to maintain its orbit ran out.Dawn soon discovered evidence of cryovolcanism. Two distinct bright spots (or high-albedo features) inside a crater (different from the bright spots observed in earlier Hubble images) were seen in a 19 February 2015 image, leading to speculation about a possible cryovolcanic origin or outgassing. On 2 September 2016 scientists from the Dawn team argued in a Science paper that Ahuna Mons was the strongest evidence yet for cryovolcanic features on Ceres. On 11 May 2015 NASA released a higher-resolution image showing that the spots were composed of multiple smaller spots. On 9 December 2015 NASA scientists reported that the bright spots on Ceres may be related to a type of salt, particularly a form of brine containing magnesium sulfate hexahydrate (MgSO4·6H2O); the spots were also found to be associated with ammonia-rich clays. In June 2016 near-infrared spectra of these bright areas were found to be consistent with a large amount of sodium carbonate, implying that recent geologic activity was probably involved in the creation of the bright spots.

The Dawn'' mission ended on 1 November 2018 after the spacecraft ran out of fuel.

Future missions 
In 2020, an ESA team proposed the Calathus Mission concept, a followup mission to Occator Crater, to return a sample of the bright carbonate faculae and dark organics to Earth. The Chinese Space Agency is designing a sample-return mission from Ceres that would take place during the 2020s.

See also 
List of exceptional asteroids
List of Solar System objects by size

Notes

References

External links 
Ceres Trek – An integrated map browser of datasets and maps for 1Ceres
Ceres 3D Model – NASA
Destination Ceres:Breakfast at Dawn – NASA
Dawn mission home page at JPL
Simulation of the orbit of Ceres
Google Ceres 3D, interactive map of the dwarf planet
How Gauss determined the orbit of Ceres  from keplersdiscovery.com
Animated reprojected colourised map of Ceres (22 February 2015)

Rotating relief model of Ceres by Seán Doran (about 60% of a full rotation; starts with Occator midway above centre)

 
000001
000001
Discoveries by Giuseppe Piazzi
Named minor planets
Minor planets visited by spacecraft
Articles containing video clips
000001
000001
000001
18010101
Dwarf planets